Valluerca is a village in Álava, Spain. It is part of the municipality of Valdegovía, Basque Country, roughly 65 kilometers south of Bilbao.

Populated places in Álava